The tanggu (堂鼓; pinyin: tánggǔ, ; literally "ceremonial hall drum"; sometimes spelled tang gu) is a traditional Chinese drum that dates all the way back to the Northern Wei Dynasty. It is medium in size and barrel-shaped, with two heads made of animal skin, and is played with two sticks.

The tanggu is usually suspended by four rings in a wooden stand.photo

The Tanggu (Drum) is known as "Tonggu". During the Qing Dynasty, it was called "Zhanggu". Its skin is normally made of buffalo's hide. The pitch and tone of the sound produced are not definite. It depends on the strength and which part of the drum skin is being hit.

There are two types of Tanggu: the Xiao Tanggu and the Da Tanggu. The only difference is that the Xiao Tanggu is smaller in size, and thus produces a higher pitch sound.

Orchestral works which uses the Tanggu includes Fisherman's Song of the East China Sea and The General's Commands.

See also
Traditional Chinese musical instruments

Drums
Asian percussion instruments
Chinese musical instruments
Directly struck membranophones
Sacred musical instruments